This is a list of minor planets named after animals and plants.

Animals

Plants

See also 
 List of minor planets
 List of minor planets named after people
 List of minor planets named after places
 List of minor planets named after rivers
 List of named minor planets (numerical) and (alphabetical)
 Meanings of minor planet names

References

External links 
 Dictionary of Minor Planet Names, Google books

 
Animals
Planets